The Battle of Pondicherry was a naval battle between a British squadron under Vice-Admiral George Pocock and French squadron under Comte d'Aché on 10 September 1759 off the Carnatic coast of India near Pondicherry during the Seven Years' War.  Pocock attempted to intercept d'Aché, whose squadron was carrying reinforcements and money for the French forces in Pondicherry. The battle was indecisive, but d'Aché successfully completed his mission when his fleet arrived in Pondicherry on 15 September. However, these forces were insufficient to reverse the declining French situation in the Carnatic.

Aftermath
Although the battle was indecisive, d'Aché's squadron survived the engagement without losing any ships and continued on to Pondicherry, reaching the city on 15 September. The battle could therefore be considered a tactical French victory, as the French squadron managed to achieve its objective of resupplying the French successfully. However, although the convoy had delivered a large amount of money to fund the French war effort, the number of troops that the squadron brought were not enough to effectively challenge Britain's growing pre-eminence on the subcontinent. This was compounded by the French governor-general Comte de Lally's strong antipathy towards the Indian people, and his refusal to use sepoys to augment his forces as the British had.

By 1759, the war in India had shifted in Britain's favour but the outcome of the war was by no means decided. However, as the war continued, Britain's strength on the subcontinent grew thanks to the arrival of significant numbers of reinforcements coupled with the recruitment of local sepoys. From 1760 onwards, Britain would begin to reconquer territories that had been lost in the Carnatic earlier in the war, and laid siege to Pondicherry by March. Despite a lengthy and brave defence, the city fell on 15 January 1761 and remained under British control until the Treaty of Paris was signed in 1763, when the city was returned to France.

Order of battle

British

French

Citations

References

Naval battles of the East Indies Campaign (1757–1763)
Conflicts in 1759
Battle of Pondicherry
Battle of Pondicherry
Battle of Pondicherry
Carnatic Wars
Naval battles involving France
Naval battles involving Great Britain